Tritiya Paksha (2018) is a Bengali short film directed by Suryoday De. The film was made under Madan Theatres Ltd.

Cast 
 Jina Tarafder
 Reshmi Roy
 Rii Sen
 Priti Haldar
 Ms. Golela

See also 
 Jamai Sasthi

References 

1931 films
Bengali-language Indian films
1930s Bengali-language films
1931 short films
Indian black-and-white films
Indian short films